Rajmata Krishna Kumari (10 February 1926 – 3 July 2018) was an Indian politician. She was the Maharani consort of Marwar-Jodhpur as the spouse of Maharaja Hanuwant Singh, and the titular regent of Marwar-Jodhpur during the minority of Gaj Singh II in 1952-1970. She was a Member of Parliament, Lok Sabha, in 1971-1977.

Life
She was the last Maharani consort of Marwar-Jodhpur in 1947–1949 as the spouse of Maharaja Hanuwant Singh.  

After the death of her husband Maharaja Hanuwant Singh in 1952, she was titular regent for son, titular Maharaja Gaj Singh II as well as stepmother of the orphaned Hukum Singh, and took charge of the princely family's interests.

She was also known as HH Maharani Krishna Kumari Ba Sahiba of Dhrangadhra. She founded a girls' school in Jodhpur, Rajamata Krishna Kumari Girls' Public school. 

She contested the Lok Sabha election in 1971 from Jodhpur and won, serving until 1977.

She died on 3 July 2018, in Jodhpur, aged 92.

The book "The Royal Blue" by Ayodhya Prasad depicts most of her life from the Princess of Dhangadhra to the Maharani of Marwar (Jodhpur).

References

1926 births
2018 deaths
Regents of India
20th-century women rulers
People from Jodhpur
India MPs 1971–1977
Queen mothers
Lok Sabha members from Rajasthan
Women in Rajasthan politics
20th-century Indian women politicians
20th-century Indian politicians
Rajput princesses
Indian queen consorts
Indian princesses
Women members of the Lok Sabha